Thomas Burgess (c. 1580 – July 1626), of Truro in Cornwall, was an English Member of Parliament. He represented Truro in the Parliaments of 1614 and 1624–5, and either he or his father sat for the same borough in 1604–1611. He also served as Mayor of Truro.

References
 
Vivian's Visitations of Cornwall (Exeter: William Pollard & Co, 1887) 

1580s births
1626 deaths
Year of birth uncertain
Members of the pre-1707 English Parliament for constituencies in Cornwall
Mayors of places in Cornwall
16th-century English people
English MPs 1614
English MPs 1624–1625